Igor Nikolayevich Alexeyev (born 23 October 1984) is a Russian former professional association football player.

Club career
He played 3 seasons in the Russian Football National League for FC Nosta Novotroitsk and FC Mashuk-KMV Pyatigorsk.

External links
 

1984 births
People from Tosnensky District
Living people
Russian footballers
Association football defenders
FC Volga Nizhny Novgorod players
FC Dynamo Saint Petersburg players
FC Avangard Kursk players
FC Nosta Novotroitsk players
FC Mashuk-KMV Pyatigorsk players
Sportspeople from Leningrad Oblast